The Thailand national beach soccer team represents Thailand in international beach soccer.

Tournament records

FIFA Beach Soccer World Cup
In 2002, Thailand made a 4th-place finish in Brazil after losing third-place playoff final against Uruguay. The team were drawn into group A alongside Brazil and managed to beat France and Spain to reach the semifinal and lost 3–2 to Portugal. Thailand's goalkeeper Vilard Normcharoen was voted goalkeeper of the tournament.

In the 2005 edition, Thailand were again drawn into the same group as Brazil and Spain but they found goals hard to come by and finished bottom of group A.

AFC Beach Soccer Championship

Asian Beach Games
In 2012, FA of Thailand appointed Mr Kittipat Meesuwan as chairman of beach soccer committee, and he appointed Mr Abolfazl Khodabandehloo as technical director and Mr Shahram Danehkar as head coach. 2012 Asian Beach Games in China is their nearest aim.

AFF Beach Soccer Championship

Others 

 Australia Beach Soccer Cup

  Runner-Up (1): 2013

Staff

Squad 
As of October 2014.

References

External links

 Thailand Beach Soccer Team

 Thailand Squad On Fifa.com

Asian national beach soccer teams
beach soccer